Kaja Kallas' first cabinet was the Cabinet of Estonia between 26 January 2021 and 14 July 2022. It was a grand coalition cabinet of the Reform Party and the Centre Party until 3 June 2022 when Kallas dismissed Centre Party ministers from government after several weeks of disputes between the two parties.

Background
The cabinet was formed after the previous cabinet led by the Centre Party resigned on 14 January 2021 following the resignation of the prime minister Jüri Ratas in the wake of a corruption scandal.

From the very beginning, pundits stated several possible coalitions, among them were Reform Party–Centre Party, Reform Party–Isamaa–SDE, Centre Party–EKRE–Isamaa, Reform Party–EKRE. On 14 January 2021, negotiations started between the Reform Party and the Centre Party. Although it was seen as a surprise to many, the leaders of Isamaa and EKRE (Helir-Valdor Seeder and Martin Helme, respectively) stated that the Centre Party members were probing a possible coalition with the Reform Party since the end of 2020.

The cabinet received its mandate on 25 January 2021.

This cabinet was the first coalition government between the Reform Party and the Centre Party since 2003. Also, it became the most gender-equal cabinet in Estonia's history.

The cabinet led Estonia in the times of health crisis of COVID-19 pandemic and energy and security crisis caused by 2022 Russian invasion of Ukraine. Estonia became one of the largest donors of weapons for Ukraine per capita and received over 40,000 Ukrainian refugees.

Ministers
The coalition agreed on 14 ministers in addition to the prime minister with seven each for Reform and Center.

In November 2021, Centre's Anneli Ott announced her resignation after criticism related to her not allowing herself to be vaccinated against COVID-19, citing disagreements with the Reform Party on restrictions. Her resignation revealed deeper disagreements between the two coalition parties regarding COVID-19 restrictions and vaccination.

On 2 June 2022, Kallas dismissed the seven ministers of the Centre Party after several weeks of deadlock, during which her coalition partner voted with the far-right EKRE opposition against an education bill. Continuing with a minority cabinet, the Reform Party called up the conservative Isamaa and the Social Democrats for talks on a possible new coalition. On July 8th, the three parties announced that they agreed on forming a new coalition government.  The new coalition was given a mandate by the Riigikogu on July 15 and became Kaja Kallas' second cabinet.

References

External links
Official Website of Estonian Government

2021 establishments in Estonia
Cabinets of Estonia
Cabinets established in 2021